A dominatrix (plural dominatrices or dominatrixes) or mistress is a woman who takes the dominant role in bondage and discipline, dominance and submission or BDSM.

As fetish culture has become more prevalent in Western media, depictions of dominatrices in film and television have become more common.

In film

In television

In gaming

In advertisement

In comic books and manga

See also
 BDSM in culture and media

References